3 Days to Open with Bobby Flay is an American reality cooking show aired on the Food Network. The series debuted on July 15, 2012. In the series, Bobby Flay visits new restaurants that will be opening three days from his arrival. He makes a list of things that he thinks need to be fixed by opening night, and spends those three days preparing the owners for opening, and attempting to check every concern off his list.

Episodes

References

External links
 Official website
 

2010s American reality television series
2012 American television series debuts
Food Network original programming
2012 American television series endings